Codsall Community High School is a coeducational upper school and sixth form located in Codsall, Staffordshire, England.

It is located in a large village in South Staffordshire, near Wolverhampton. A total of 1017 pupils (including more than 300 sixth formers) attend the school.

History 
Codsall High School was opened in May 1940, taking 126 pupils aged 11 and over from the village's school by St Nicholas Church. The school also took pupils from the neighbouring village of Bilbrook. After the war, the school expanded; by 1954, there were 728 children on the roll. An extension was opened in 1957, including the school's present Main Hall. A small swimming pool was constructed in the school's quadrangle in 1964, a roof was added in the 1970s.

The school became an 11-18 Comprehensive in 1969; at the same time, headteacher George Gibbs retired and was replaced by Ron Mitson. A further extension was built in the early 1970s, and the school's catchment area expanded to include the village of Pattingham.

Geoff Bate succeeded as headmaster in September 1972, at the same time that the school's capacity was reduced due to the entry age being increased from 11 to 13 as part of the introduction of three-tier education in the area.

Original plans for a high school in Perton were cancelled, and pupils travelled to Codsall upon completing middle school, leading to a growth in pupil numbers. A community sports centre opened during the mid-1970s, refurbished using National Lottery money from 2003.

Mr Bate retired in 1994, replaced by Mr E. Liddy. A further extension was built around this time. The school's current head until the end of the 2014-2015 academic year was Mrs Tunnicliffe, appointed in 2005. The current head, Mr Harding, was appointed in 2015. The school is joined up with two local middle schools (Bilbrook and Perton) making it part of a federation of schools.

In September 2004 it became the first to achieve specialist school status in Maths and Computing and in 2013 was rated good by Ofsted.

In 2006, the school was found to contain asbestos in some classrooms. In 2014, the school’s minibus was involved in a crash that resulted in four children injured and three adults were hurt.

In 2018, the yearly cost for Perton students travelling by bus trebled to more than £600 resulting in protests.

Curriculum
Following the recognition of the school as a specialist in mathematics and computing, the school's focus shifted in the 2000s to the delivery of more ICT and computing courses, as well as vocational qualifications.  However, Codsall Community High School offers a wide range of courses, and was the last comprehensive school in South Staffordshire still to offer classical subjects, including Classical Civilisation and Latin, however, these stopped being taught after the year of 2010.

Academic attainment peaked in 2008 when the school achieved record results in GCSE exams with 72% of candidates receiving the top four grades, A*-C. Since then results have fallen steadily, In 2012, 62% of all pupils attained five GCSEs grade A* to C including English and mathematics. This is a decrease of six percentage points since 2011.

A room for the Sixth Form was opened by Sir Patrick Cormack in September 2008, named in memory of former headmaster Geoff Bate. Rock band The Hoosiers visited the community project in October 2008 to support the students and the hard work that they had undertaken.

In 2009, Codsall Community High School extended their curriculum provision by becoming the first state school in the country to run a post-16 Football Academy. The scheme offers students, aged 16–18 years, the opportunity to study for nationally recognised qualifications whilst receiving high quality football coaching daily.

Notable alumni

 Paul Tucker (banker), Former Deputy Governor of the Bank of England
 Jim Lea - member of Slade, perfected his electronic violin skills under the tutelage of Ron Williams
 Emma Reynolds Labour Member of Parliament for Wolverhampton North East & Shadow Junior Foreign Office Minister
 William Regal - WWE Wrestler
 Gareth Morgan - Daily Star Sunday editor 
 Christopher Sadler -  award-winning Animator Director for Aardman Animations who has worked on Wallace and Gromit, Chicken Run, Cracking Contraptions, Creature Comforts and Shaun the Sheep
 Peter Baker - Golfer, and member of 1993 Ryder Cup team.
 Professor David Leigh FRS - Scientist and Fellow of the Royal Society, currently Sir Samuel Hall Chair of Chemistry at the University of Manchester
 Bernard O'Mahoney - Author
 Vanessa McKeown - Photographer

Sources
 The Story of Codsall and Bilbrook Schools, Codsall and Bilbrook History Society, 1993

References

External links
 CCHS Football Academy website
 Official website

South Staffordshire District
Community schools in Staffordshire
Upper schools in Staffordshire
Educational institutions established in 1940
1940 establishments in England